Kayama Island (Japanese: 嘉弥真島, Kayama-jima) is a small uninhabited island located in the Yaeyama Islands of Okinawa Prefecture, Japan. It situated 2 kilometers northeast of Kohama Island. 

It is known for its rabbit population, numbering anywhere between 500 and 1,000. Travel agencies offer tours to the island.

References 

Ryukyu Islands